Kristofer O'Dowd (born May 14, 1988) is a former American football center. He was signed by the Arizona Cardinals as an undrafted free agent in 2011. He played college football for the University of Southern California.

High school career
O'Dowd's 2006 honors included Parade All-American, EA Sports All-American first-team, Super Prep All-American, Prep Star All-American, USA Today All-USA second-team, Super Prep Elite 50, Prep Star 100, Rivals.com 100, Super Prep All-Farwest, Prep Star All-West, Scout.com All-West, Long Beach Press-Telegram Best in the West first-team, Orange County Register Fab 15 first-team, Tacoma News-Tribune Western 100 and All-State as a senior offensive lineman at Salpointe Catholic High in Tucson (Ariz.).  He was also invited to play in the 2007 U.S. Army All-American Bowl alongside fellow USC recruits Marc Tyler, Chris Galippo, and Everson Griffen.  He recorded 90 pancake blocks in 2006.  As a junior in 2005, he made the All-State first-team. He also attended Salpointe Catholic Highschool in Tucson, Arizona.

College career

The 6-foot-5, 300-pound O'Dowd is the first true freshman in USC history to start a game at center for the Trojans.   According to USC officials, the last true freshman to start an opener on the offensive line was guard Travis Claridge against Penn State in 1996.  Guard Brad Budde was the only other true freshman offensive lineman to start a post-World War II opener. Budde played against Missouri in 1976.  His sophomore year, he was named to the 2008 First-team All-Pac-10.

He suffered a kneecap injury before the 2009 season, and had to sit out the opener against San Jose State; his spot was filled in by veteran tackle Jeff Byers.

Professional career

Arizona Cardinals
Despite being considered the 3rd best Center prospect in the NFL draft, O'Dowd was not selected in the 2011 NFL Draft. He was signed as a free agent by the Arizona Cardinals. He was released on September 2, 2011.

New York Jets
The New York Jets signed O'Dowd on March 13, 2012. He was waived on May 6, 2012.

Seattle Seahawks
O'Dowd was signed by the Seattle Seahawks on August 16, 2012.

References

External links

USC Trojans bio
Seattle Seahawks bio

1988 births
Living people
American football offensive linemen
USC Trojans football players
Arizona Cardinals players
New York Jets players
Seattle Seahawks players